Prečani is an uninhabited village in the municipality of Trnovo, Federation of Bosnia and Herzegovina, Bosnia and Herzegovina.

Demographics 
According to the 2013 census, its population was just 1, a Serb.

References

Populated places in Trnovo, Sarajevo
Former villages